RK Nada (full name Ragbi klub Nada, English: Rugby Club Nada) is a rugby union club from Split, Croatia. It participates in the Croatian Rugby Championship, the Croatian Rugby Cup and the Regional Rugby Championship. The club was founded on February 23, 1959.

Club seat is on the address Zrinsko-Frankopanska 17, Split.

The club was the most successful in the Rugby Championship of Yugoslavia, with eleven championships, as well as in modern Croatian competitions.

Team

Trophies 
Trophee International Du Fair-Play Pierre De Coubertin 1987

Championships 
 Croatian champions (26):
 19811, 1991/92, 1992/93, 1994/95, 1995/96, 1996/97, 1998/99, 1999/00, 2002/03, 2003/04, 2004/05, 2005/06, 2006/07, 2007/08, 2008/09, 2009/10, 2010/2011, 2011/2012, 2012/13, 2013/14, 2014/15, 2015/16, 2016/17, 2017/18, 2018/19, 2020/21  
1 The only such championship held during Yugoslavia.

 Yugoslav champions (11):
 1962, 1963, 1964, 1965, 1966, 1967, 1970, 1971, 1972, 1973, 1989.
 Croatian champions Rugby 7 (5):
 2007, 2008, 2009, 2010, 2011

Cups
 Croatian cup (15):
 1993, 1998, 1999, 2000, 2004, 2005, 2007, 2008, 2009, 2010, 2011, 2012, 2013, 2014, 2016
 Yugoslav cup (9):
 1964, 1968, 1969, 1970, 1972, 1976, 1982, 1984, 1989

European and regional championships
 Central European Champions' Cup (1):
 2001: champions (victory over Czech team Dragon Brno)
 Interleague (Croatia, Slovenia) champions (3):
 2003/04, 2006/07, 2007/08
 Regional (BiH, Bulgaria, Croatia, Hungary, Serbia and Slovenia) Rugby champions (9):
 2007/08, 2008/09, 2009/10, 2010/2011, 2011/12, 2012/13, 2013/14, 2016/17, 2017/18
 European Champions' Cup for amateur teams:
 2005: third
 2006: second (lost in finals to Russian team Slava Zenit)

Youth Trophies

National champions 
 U-19
 1969, 1984, 1985, 1989, 1992, 1993, 1994, 1995, 1996, 1998, 2000, 2001, 2002, 2003, 2004, 2005, 2006, 2008, 2010
 U-17
 1994, 1995, 1996, 1997, 1998, 1999, 2008, 2009, 2010
 U-16
 1982, 1983, 1987, 1993, 1994, 1995, 1996, 1997, 1998, 2000, 2001, 2003, 2004, 2005, 2006, 2008
 U-14
 1995, 1996, 2001, 2004, 2005, 2006, 2007, 2008
 U-12
1995, 1996, 2001, 2005

Cup winners  
 U-19
 1983, 1984, 1985, 1991, 1992, 1993, 1994, 1995, 1996, 1997, 1999, 2000, 2001, 2002, 2003, 2004, 2005, 2008, 2009, 2010
 U-17
 1996, 1997, 1998, 1999, 2000, 2008, 2009, 2010
 U-16
 1993, 1994, 1995, 1996, 1997, 1998, 1999, 2000, 2001, 2002, 2003, 2004, 2008

External links 
 RK Nada website
 Profile on Regional Rugby Championship website

Croatian rugby union teams
Rugby clubs established in 1959
Sport in Split, Croatia